John Spencer Smith FRS (11 September 1769 – 5 June 1845) was a British diplomat, politician and writer.

Husband of Constance Smith (née Herbert) (Byron's Florence).

Career
Smith joined the British Army in 1790 as an ensign, later promoted to lieutenant. When France declared war on Britain in February 1793 he was in Turkey with his elder brother, Sidney Smith, who obtained a position for him in the British embassy in Constantinople. He was private secretary to the ambassador, Robert Liston, and was chargé d'affaires after Liston left Constantinople in November 1795. He was formally appointed Secretary of Legation in 1798 and continued to serve as chargé d'affaires ad interim.

Smith left Constantinople in 1801 and arrived in England just in time to be invited to stand for Parliament for the borough of Dover in the United Kingdom general election of 1802. While he was a member of parliament he was sent on a mission as Envoy Extraordinary to Württemberg in 1803–04. This mission was interpreted by the French as espionage and used to justify the kidnap of Sir George Rumbold at Hamburg.

Smith withdrew from Dover at the general election of 1806 and soon afterwards settled in Normandy where he wrote on a variety of scholarly subjects. He died at Caen on 5 June 1845.

References
SMITH, John Spencer (1769-1845) in The History of Parliament: the House of Commons 1790-1820, ed. R. Thorne, 1986
Fétis (1865), Biographie universelle des musiciens et bibliographie générale de la musique, vol.8, p.54 (in French)

External links

1769 births
1845 deaths
Grenadier Guards officers
British diplomats
Members of the Parliament of the United Kingdom for Dover
19th-century English writers
Fellows of the Royal Society
UK MPs 1802–1806
19th-century English male writers